Sphingosine-1-phosphate receptor 2, also known as S1PR2 or S1P2, is a human gene which encodes a G protein-coupled receptor which binds the lipid signaling molecule sphingosine 1-phosphate (S1P).

Function 

This protein participates in sphingosine 1-phosphate-induced cell proliferation, survival, and transcriptional activation. It has also been shown to interact with Nogo-A (RTN4), an neurite outgrowth inhibitor. S1PR2 is expressed in neuronal and vascular cells and is crucial for the migration and growth of developing and injured neuronal and vascular system.

See also
 Lysophospholipid receptor

References

Further reading

External links

 

G protein-coupled receptors